Mahavir Mandir is a Hindu temple dedicated to the god Hanuman, located in Patna, Bihar, India. Millions of pilgrims visit the temple every year. Acharya Kishore Kunal is the secretary of the Mahavir Mandir Temple Trust, Patna.

History
As per the Patna High Court judgment in 1948 the temple exists since time immemorial. This temple gained popularity in 1947 with large number of Hindu refugees coming to Patna after the partition of India. Subsequently, temple was rebuilt as a concrete house at same time. Later this was demolished in 1987 to construct a huge marble temple. The idol of Sankat-Mochan, an avatar of Hanuman, stands in it.

Visits
Long winding queues can be seen at the temple on Saturdays and Tuesdays, the traditional worshiping days of Hanuman. Thousands of people visit Mahavir Mandir on every Rama Navami and New Year celebration. On Rama Navami, the queues can be over one kilometer long.

Dalit Priest
Since 13 June 1993, Suryavanshi Das, a person from the Dalit caste, became priest of the temple, the decision taken received support from three well known priests—Ramchandra Paramahans, Mahant Avaidyanath of Baba Gorakhnath Dham and Mahant Avadh Kishore Das.

Ram Rasoi
Arrangements for free food have been made to the devotees who visit Ramlala at Ram Rasoi. Acharya Kishore Kunal, secretary of the Shri Mahavir Sthan Nyas Samiti, started it on Sunday 1 December 2019. This free food facility functions in the Amava temple just outside the temple of Ramlala, at Amawa Mandir Complex, Ramkot, Ayodhya-224123. Devotees who visit Ramlala at Ram Rasoi get free food between 11:30 am till 3:00 pm every day.
For this, 60 quintals of Govind Bhog shear rice have been sent to Ayodhya. This rice has been sourced from Mokri village in Kaimur (Bihar). The services of Shri Ram's kitchen and Shri Ramlala's bhog will function continuously. There is arrangement of feeding one thousand people daily in the initial phase. After this, based on the increasing number of Ramlala's devotees, food will be arranged for more and more people.

Sita Rasoi
Free Sita Rasoi is being operated by Shri Mahavir Sthan Nyas Samiti at Punaura Dham in Sitamadhi district of Bihar. This is the first temple in the country, which is successfully running Sita-Rasoi in Sitamadi, the birthplace of Sita. All the pilgrims are provided free food here. Sita Rasoi has been functioning free of cost since 27 January 2019 on behalf of Shri Mahavir Sthan Nyas Samiti.
This day coincided with the birthday of Swami Ramanandacharya in the year 2019. Devotees who visit Mata Janaki's birth-place are provided with free meals (lunch and dinner both) here. Sita Rasoi was postponed from March 22 due to COVID-19 lockdown. It reopened on 2 February 2021 which was again the birthday of Swami Ramanandacharya in 2021.

Philanthropic work by Shri Mahavir Sthan Nyas Samiti
Mahavir Mandir Trust is named Shri Mahavir Sthan Nyas Samiti(श्री महावीर स्थान न्यास समिति). Headed by Acharya Kishore Kunal, the trust monitors working and development of temple. The Trusts uses the temple fund to run human welfare organizations and hospitals like Mahavir Cancer Institute & Research Centre, Mahavir Vaatsalya Hospital and Mahavir Arogya Hospital and other several hospitals and orphanage in the agricultural and rural state of Bihar. 
The Mahavir Mandir Trust has the second highest budget in North India, after that of the Maa Vaishno Devi shrine.

Publications
The temple started the publication of Dharmayan, a magazine focusing on culture, religion, and nationality in 1990. Since then the magazine has continuously been in publication. They recently celebrated a Diamond Jublee with the publication of its 100th issue. Dignitaries such as Acharya Sitaram Chaturvedi, Sahitya Vachaspati Shriranjan Suridev, Dr. Kashinath Mishra have been associated with this esteemed magazine. Currently Acharya Kishore Kunal graces the position of Chief Editor and it is being edited by Pandit Bhavanath Jha.

See also
Viraat Ramayan Mandir
Deo Sun Temple
Baba Garib Sthan Mandir

References

External links
 Mahavir Mandir published an ebook on Ayodhya debate written by Acharya Kishore Kunal that was at this link www.mahavirmandirpatna.org/prakashan/ebook/bookindex.html
 Mahavir Mandir Patna official website
 http://mahavirmandir.com/
 History of Mahavir Mandir on  "Official website Patna"  
 धर्मायण - धार्मिक, सांस्कृतिक एवं राष्ट्रीय चेतना की हिन्दी मासिक पत्रिका Dharmayan Magazine

Hanuman temples
Hindu temples in Bihar
Religious buildings and structures in Patna
Rebuilt buildings and structures in India